Gulset is a suburb located in Skien, Telemark, Norway. It is the most populated suburb in Skien with over 7,000 inhabitants.

Schools

Stigeråsen Skole
Stigeråsen was opened in 1981 and it is an elementary school for children from first grade to grade 7.

Kollmyr Skole
Kollmyr (1974) is a public school that serves from grade 1. to grade 7.

Gulset Ungdomsskole
Gulset Ungdomsskole is the largest middle school in Skien with students from the three public schools Stigeråsen, Kollmyr and Skotfoss.

References

Skien